Lodi is an unincorporated community in northern Marion County, Texas, United States.  Its elevation is 253 feet (77 m).  It has a post office with the ZIP code 75564. The only business in Lodi, Texas is Lodi Drilling & Service Company Inc.

The settlement is named for Lodi, Italy.

References

External links
 

Unincorporated communities in Marion County, Texas
Unincorporated communities in Texas